The Tucson mayoral election of 2003 occurred on November 4, 2003 to elect the mayor of Tucson, and occurred coinciding with the elections to the Tucson City Council wards 1, 2 and 4. It saw the reelection of incumbent mayor Bob Walkup.

Nominations
Primaries were held for the Democratic, Libertarian, and Republican parties on September 9, 2003.

Democratic primary
The Democratic Party saw Tom Volgy win 10,365 votes, or 97.67% of the vote. He was originally challenged by Paul Wallace for the nomination, but Wallace formally withdrew his candidacy.

Libertarian primary

Republican primary

Other
Patricia Irish unsuccessfully sought to run with no party affiliation, but did not garner enough signatures.

General election

Polling

Results

Notes

References

Mayoral elections in Tucson, Arizona
Tucson
Tucson